Jangalia Gaon Ganja is a village in Nainital District,Uttarakhand,India.

History and Location 

Jangalia Gaon Ganja comes under Nainital District in Uttarakhand. The village has a population of 1135 members from 215 families. The village comes under Jangalia Gaon Ganja panchayat.
Average literacy rate of village is low compared to rest of the state. Village is well connected with public transport.

References 

Villages in Nainital district